The Real World Homecoming: New York is the first season of a 2021 spin-off miniseries of The Real World, that reunited the cast of the first season of the show to live in the same New York loft they lived in for the original series, nearly 30 years after filming ended.

This Homecoming edition of the show is the second reunion edition of the show (following Reunited: The Real World Las Vegas) and depicts the original cast members from 1992 moving back into the same loft in which they lived in 1992, with the exception of Eric Nies, who participated virtually after testing positive for COVID-19.

The cast members reflected on their time filming the first season and discussed ways in which their experiences affected their lives, and those of their families. The cast also discussed ways in which the culture had changed their views on things such as race relations from their time filming the inaugural season in 1992, and how society was reflected in the modern state of reality television, of which they expressed critical views.

Episodes

References

External links
 

2021 American television seasons
Television shows set in New York City
The Real World (TV series)
Television shows filmed in New York City